Lecithocera altusana is a moth in the family Lecithoceridae first described by Kyu-Tek Park in 1999. It is found in Taiwan.

The wingspan is 15-15.5 mm. The forewings are relatively broad and even broader towards the termen. The ground colour is yellowish brown, scattered with brown scales. There are two well defined dark discal spots, the distal one being much larger and elongated vertically. A dark brown line runs along the termen. The hindwings are slightly broader than the forewings.

Etymology
The species name is derived from the Latin altus (meaning high).

References

Moths described in 1999
altusana